Ricardo Tarcisio Navarrete Montes de Oca (born 29 July 1954) is a Mexican politician and diplomat from the National Action Party. From 2000 to 2003 he served as Deputy of the LVIII Legislature of the Mexican Congress representing the Federal District.

He is the incumbent Ambassador of Mexico to Greece, Moldova and Cyprus since 2011. He previously served as Ambassador to Honduras from 2007 to 2011.

References

1954 births
Living people
Politicians from Mexico City
National Action Party (Mexico) politicians
Ambassadors of Mexico to Honduras
Ambassadors of Mexico to Greece
21st-century Mexican politicians
Deputies of the LVIII Legislature of Mexico
Members of the Chamber of Deputies (Mexico) for Mexico City